Liuzhou–Nanning intercity railway is a high-speed railway in South-Western China. It connects the provincial capital of Nanning to the north east of Guangxi province. It also connects with the Hengyang–Liuzhou intercity railway, allowing for diverse connections with distant destinations, such as Wuhan, Shanghai, and Beijing.

History
Construction commenced in 2009 and was completed in mid 2013. It was opened for service on 28 December 2013. It was part of a network of railways that opened on the same day, connecting Nanning to Beihai on the coast.

Route

Notes

High-speed railway lines in China
Railway lines opened in 2013
25 kV AC railway electrification